George Luke (born 9 December 1943) is an English former professional footballer who played as an midfielder.

Club career
Born in Hetton-le-Hole, Luke was initially scouted by Manchester United, with a scout reportedly sent to his house each weekend, offering the family £30 each time for Luke to sign. He started his career with Liverpool, where he expressed his concern to then-assistant manager Bob Paisley that teammate Tommy Smith would be ahead of him in consideration for the first team, to which Paisley reportedly replied "Oh him. He’s absolutely rubbish. You’ll have no trouble."

He signed for Newcastle United at the age of fifteen, where he was made to train in heavy black boots with a steel toe cap. He then signed for Chelsea, where his steel toe cap boots were ridiculed by teammates. After suffering with homesickness, manager Tommy Docherty offered to sign one of his friends to help. Despite making one appearance for Chelsea in the league in the 1966–67 season, Luke handed in a transfer request as he was still unsettled at the West-London club.

He became the first British player to sign for a transfer fee in South Africa when he moved in 1968 to sign for Durban City. He went on to play for East London United, Jewish Guild and Highlands Park. While at Highlands Park, he played against Ballon d'Or winner George Best, who had moved to South Africa to sign for Jewish Guild. Following the game, the two would go drinking together.

Luke left South Africa in 1976; following the Soweto uprising he had grown concerned for his family's safety, and he moved to Ireland, where he spent three seasons with St Patrick's Athletic.

International career
Luke represented the England Schoolboys.

References

1948 births
Living people
People from Hetton-le-Hole
Footballers from Tyne and Wear
English footballers
England youth international footballers
Association football midfielders
Liverpool F.C. players
Chelsea F.C. players
Newcastle United F.C. players
Durban City F.C. players
East London United F.C. players
Jewish Guild players
Sligo Rovers F.C. managers
St Patrick's Athletic F.C. players
English expatriate footballers
English expatriate sportspeople in South Africa
Expatriate soccer players in South Africa
English expatriate sportspeople in Ireland
Expatriate association footballers in the Republic of Ireland